Fleawort is a common name for several plants and may refer to:

Conyza canadensis, native to North America and Central America
Inula conyza
Plantago species, especially:
Plantago psyllium
Senecio species, especially:
Senecio integrifolius